Alexandre le Borgne de Belle-Isle (c. 1640 – c. 1693), the son of Emmanuel Le Borgne, was a temporary governor of Acadia.

References

External links 
 
 Genealogie Quebec

Le Borgne, Alexandre